The 1974 Tour of the Basque Country was the 14th edition of the Tour of the Basque Country cycle race and was held from 1 April to 5 April 1974. The race started in Ordizia and finished in San Sebastián. The race was won by Miguel María Lasa of the Kas team.

General classification

References

1974
Bas